The article provides details and data regarding the geographical distribution of all Portuguese speakers, regardless of the legislative status of the countries where it's spoken. The Portuguese language is one of the most widely spoken languages in the world and is an official language of countries in four continents. It is the most spoken language in South America and the Southern Hemisphere.

Statistics

Native speakers 
This table depicts the native speakers of the language, which means that the table includes people who have been exposed to the Portuguese language from birth and, thus, excludes people who use the language as a L2.

See also
Geographical distribution of Portuguese
Lusophone

Notes

References